Monochroa pallida is a moth of the family Gelechiidae. It was described by Sakamaki in 1996. It is found in Japan (Hokkaido, Honshu).

The wingspan is 8.9-10.6 mm. The forewings are ochreous yellow, darkened towards the apical and costal margins. There are two parallel oblique fasciae, one dark fuscous and running from the middle of the costa toward the disc, and another white fascia running from the apical one-third of the costa to the middle of the termen. There is a white outwards-oblique strigula from the tornus to the disc and there are three minute white dots placed on the apical one-third of the costa and three similar dots on the termen. The hindwings are greyish fuscous.

References

Moths described in 1996
Monochroa